Stanley railway station was located in the Scottish village of Stanley, Perthshire and was opened in 1848 and closed in 1857, when the new station of Stanley Junction was built to the north in the location where the junction where the Perth and Dunkeld Railway diverged from the Scottish Midland Junction Railway running between Perth and Arbroath.

History
Opened by the Scottish Midland Junction Railway, and absorbed into the Caledonian Railway, it became part of the London, Midland and Scottish Railway during the Grouping of 1923. Passing on to the Scottish Region of British Railways on nationalisation in 1948, it was then closed by the British Transport Commission.

References

Notes

Sources 
 
 
 

Disused railway stations in Perth and Kinross
Railway stations in Great Britain opened in 1848
Railway stations in Great Britain opened in 1857
Railway stations in Great Britain closed in 1857
Railway stations in Great Britain closed in 1956
Former Caledonian Railway stations
Former Highland Railway stations